The Waratah Cup is a knockout cup competition in New South Wales, run by the governing body of football in NSW, Football NSW. Teams competing in the Waratah Cup come from the National Premier Leagues NSW, National Premier Leagues NSW 2, National Premier Leagues NSW 3, National Premier Leagues NSW 4 and numerous other semi professional & amateur association clubs within New South Wales. The Cup is held during the NPL NSW seasons.  Since 2014 preliminary rounds of the Waratah Cup have been used to determine the NSW entrants to the national FFA Cup competition, now known as the Australia Cup.

History

The Waratah Cup commenced in 1991 teams featuring clubs from the top 4 tiers of football in New South Wales, as well as teams from non-league associations.

Hakoah Sydney City East have won the cup the most times with seven wins. Sydney Crescent Star are the only non-league team to win the competition in 2004.

Current cup competitions (since 2014)
Since 2014 the Waratah Cup has become part of the qualifying competition for the FFA Cup, now known as the Australia Cup.  In 2014, seven teams qualified for the Round of 32.

For 2015, the preliminary rounds of the 2015 FFA Cup replaced the early rounds of the competition; the 5 NSW qualifiers to the Round of 32 then competed for the 2015 Waratah Cup.

Starting in 2015, the reigning champions of the National Premier Leagues qualified directly for the FFA Cup proper (round of 32).  Blacktown City, Sydney United, and Wollongong Wolves won the NPL national championships in 2015, 2016, and 2019 respectively.  Therefore the three teams were not required to participate in FFA Cup preliminary rounds in 2016, 2017, and 2021.  They were also seeded directly into final rounds of the Waratah Cup in the respective seasons, along with the other FFA Cup qualifiers from NSW.

From 2020 onwards, NSW qualification to the Round of 32 decreased to four slots instead of the previous five.

Previous Waratah Cup competitions since Federation

Honours since Federation 
All-time honour board
This list includes all Waratah Cup champions and runners-up since the inaugural New South Wales Federation of Soccer Clubs in 1957.

Earlier NSW State Cups pre-Federation

See also
 National Premier Leagues NSW
 NSW League One
 NSW League Two
 NSW League Three
 Football NSW

Notes

References

External links
 Waratah Cup website

 
Recurring sporting events established in 1991
Soccer cup competitions in Australia